Monilea smithi is a species of sea snail, a marine gastropod mollusk in the family Trochidae, the top snails.

Description
The height of the shell attains 15 mm, its diameter 20 mm. The umbilicate shell has a globose-conic shape. The 6 to 7 whorls are encircled by numerous unequal, grained, partly pearly riblets. The convex base is sculptured with smoother riblets, their interstices cancellated. The umbilicus is deeply channelled. The aperture is rounded-quadrate. The columella is deeply sinuous, callous, terminating in an acute denticle. The outer lip is sulcate within, subcinereus or ashen-reddish, with scattered obscure spots on the upper whorls. The lip is thickened in adults and is silvery-pearly.

Distribution
This marine species occurs off Japan.

References

 Dunker., Ind. Moll. Mar. Jap., p. 259, t. 6, f. 16-19, 1882.
 Higo, S., Callomon, P. & Goto, Y. (1999) Catalogue and Bibliography of the Marine Shell-Bearing Mollusca of Japan. Elle Scientific Publications, Yao, Japan, 749 pp

External links
 To World Register of Marine Species
 

smithi
Gastropods described in 1828